Mordellistena antennata is a beetle in the genus Mordellistena of the family Mordellidae. It was described in 1906 by Schilsky.

References

antennata
Beetles described in 1906